Udea pyranthes is a moth of the family Crambidae. It is endemic to the Hawaiian islands of Kauai, Oahu, Molokai, Maui and Hawaii.

The larvae feed on Vactinium calycinum, Vactinium penduliflorum and Vactinium penduliflorum gemmaceum. The caterpillar has a pale brown head checkered with darker brown.

External links

Moths described in 1899
Endemic moths of Hawaii
pyranthes